Michelle of France (11 January 1395 – 8 July 1422), also called Michelle of Valois, was Duchess consort of Burgundy as the first wife of Philip III, Duke of Burgundy, called "Philip the Good". She was born a princess of France as the daughter of Charles VI, King of France and Isabeau of Bavaria.

Life

Early life 
Michelle of France was born on 11 January 1395 as the seventh child and fifth daughter of Charles VI, King of France (1368–1422) and his wife, born Isabeau/Isabelle of Bavaria (c. 1371–1435). Three of her elder siblings had already died by the time of her birth, however, she had five younger siblings, four of whom survived infancy. She was named for Saint Michael the Archangel after her father noted an improvement in his health after a pilgrimage to Mont Saint-Michel in 1393. The children of the royal family were raised with great care. Their mother purchased luxurious toys, clothes and gifts for them, and regularly corresponded with them when they were apart. During pandemics, she ensured they were sent to safety in the countryside.

Marriage 
In June 1409, at the age of 14, Michelle married 13-year-old Philip, Count of Charolais (1396–1467), son and heir of John I, Duke of Burgundy ("John the Fearless", 1371–1419). They had probably been engaged on 28 January 1405, at the age of 9 and 8, respectively. Michelle and Philip were second cousins, both descending from John II, King of France ("John the Good"). At the same time, Michelle's eldest brother, Louis, Dauphin of Viennois (1397–1415) married Philip's eldest sister Margaret (1393–1442). Michelle and Philip had a daughter, Agnes, who died in infancy.

On 10 September 1419, Michelle's father-in-law John the Fearless was assassinated, with involvement from her brother, Charles (1403–1461), the new dauphin as a part of the Armagnac–Burgundian Civil War. The civil war was fought for power during the mental instability of King Charles VI (Michelle's father). It is possible that John had been behind the deaths of Michelle's two brothers, Louis (1397–1415) and John (1398–1417). It has also been suggested that the Armagnac party wanted John dead to prevent a likely rapprochement between him and the dauphin, which could have diminished their influence. Michelle became melancholic (what we would today call extremely depressed) following the assassination.

Death 
In 1422, while her husband was away preparing for the battle of Cone, Michelle fell ill and died on 8 July in Ghent. All of the inhabitants grieved, as she had been much loved by the people. She was buried in Saint Bavo's Abbey near the city. In 1540, the abbey was destroyed on the orders of Charles V, Holy Roman Emperor, causing only a fragment of her tomb to remain to this day. After her death, rumors circulated that she had been poisoned by a former attendant, known as Dame de Viesville, a close confidante dismissed shortly before Michelle's death. However, no charges were ever brought up against her.

Her widower married two more times, first two years after her death to Bonne of Artois (1396–1425). He had three children from his third marriage, and at least 18 illegitimate children from a total of 24 documented mistresses, two of whom were certainly born during his marriage to Michelle.

Ancestry

References 

Duchesses of Burgundy
1395 births
1422 deaths
French princesses
House of Valois
Countesses of Burgundy
Countesses of Flanders
Countesses of Artois
Murdered royalty
Philip the Good (Duke of Burgundy)
14th-century French people 
14th-century French women  
15th-century French people 
15th-century French women
Daughters of kings